Echimyidae is the family of neotropical spiny rats and their fossil relatives. This is the most species-rich family of hystricognath rodents. It is probably also the most ecologically diverse, with members ranging from fully arboreal to terrestrial to fossorial to semiaquatic habits. They presently exist mainly in South America; three members of the family also range into Central America, and the hutias are found in the Greater Antilles in the Caribbean. Species of the extinct subfamily Heteropsomyinae formerly lived on Cuba, Hispaniola, and Puerto Rico in the Antilles, probably until the arrival of Europeans.

Characteristics 

In general form, most spiny rats resemble rats, although they are more closely related to guinea pigs and chinchillas. Most species have  stiff, pointed hairs, or spines, that presumably serve for protection from predators.

Many echimyids can break off their tails when attacked.  This action may confuse predators long enough for the spiny rat to escape.  Unlike the tails of some species of lizards, however, the tails of spiny rats do not regenerate.  Therefore, the tactic can only be used once in an individual's lifetime.

Most spiny rats are rare and poorly known, but a few are extremely abundant.  Various species are respectively terrestrial, arboreal, or fossorial.  In general, the arboreal forms are most rat-like in appearance, whilst the burrowing species are more gopher-like, with stocky bodies and short tails. Most species do poorly in conditions of high heat and aridity and are restricted to regions with abundant water.  They are almost exclusively herbivorous.

Systematics 
The current taxonomic content of the family Echimyidae has been reshaped over time, and its organization into coherent units stems from two realizations. The first is that cladistic approaches applied to morphological characters showed that many traits used to define taxa were plesiomorphic or homoplastic. The second realization came from the advent of phylogenetic analyses of DNA sequence and protein sequence data with probability methods — maximum likelihood and Bayesian inference — leading to the identification of robust clades and the recognition of higher categorical ranks (see Phylogeny section). The following table recapitulates and compares the taxonomic content of taxa recognized on molecular and traditional basis: the two families Capromyidae and Myocastoridae, the five subfamilies Echimyinae, Euryzygomatomyinae, Capromyinae, Dactylomyinae, Eumysopinae, and the four tribes Echimyini, Myocastorini, Capromyini, and Plagiodontini.

Extant genera 
 Family Echimyidae - spiny rats

Extinct genera 
 Family Echimyidae - spiny rats
 †Cercomys
 †Maruchito
 †Paulacoutomys
 †Proclinodontomys
 †Willidewu
 Subfamily †Adelphomyinae
 †Adelphomys
 †Deseadomys
 †Paradelphomys
 †Stichomys
 †Xylechimys
 Subfamily †Heteropsomyinae - extinct West Indian echimyids
 †Boromys
 †Brotomys
 †Heteropsomys
 †Puertoricomys
 Subfamily Eumysopinae
 †Acarechimys
 †Chasichimys
 †Eumysops
 †Palaeoechimys
 †Pampamys
 †Pattersomys
 †Protacaremys
 †Protadelphomys
 †Sallamys
Subfamily Capromyinae - hutias
†Hexolobodon
†Hyperplagiodontia
†Isolobodon
†Rhizoplagiodontia

About Chaetomys 
The bristle-spined rat, Chaetomys subspinosus, has sometimes been classified in Echimyidae, although traditionally considered a member of the New World porcupine family Erethizontidae. The classification with Echimyidae is supported by similarities in the cheek teeth structure.
Like all living caviomorphs except erethizontids, Chaetomys seems to lack posterior carotid foramina, and together with all echimyids and in contrast to all other caviomorphs, Chaetomys seems to retain the otherwise deciduous premolars (dP4).
Some of these characters have been, however, reinterpreted as evidence for affinities between Chaetomys and the Erethizontidae.
A molecular phylogeny based on the mitochondrial gene coding for cytochrome b combined to karyological evidence actually suggests Chaetomys is more closely related to the Erethizontidae than to the Echimyidae, although it branches as the sister group to the rest of the Erethizontidae.

Phylogeny 
The phylogenetic tree of the Echimyidae shows a major split between the subfamily Echimyinae and an assemblage containing the Euryzygomatomyinae, Carterodon, and the Capromyidae.
The first major clade contains a majority of arboreal genera (e.g., Phyllomys, Dactylomys, and Mesomys), a few terrestrial taxa (e.g., Proechimys), and a subaquatic one (Myocastor).
The second major clade includes fossorial genera (e.g., Euryzygomatomys or Carterodon), a terrestrial one (Trinomys), and members inhabiting the Caribbean islands (Capromyidae).

References and notes 

 
Rodent families
Hystricognath rodents
Extant Chattian first appearances
Taxa named by John Edward Gray